Over and Out is a 2018 studio album by Status Quo guitarist and vocalist Rick Parfitt. Parfitt died on 24 December 2016, and the album, his first and only solo album, was completed and released posthumously on 23 March 2018. The album includes contributions from a number of guest musicians, including current and former Status Quo bassists John "Rhino" Edwards and Alan Lancaster respectively; former Status Quo drummer Jeff Rich; Queen's Brian May; Chris Wolstenholme of Muse; and Parfitt's son, Rick Parfitt, Jnr.

History
Parfitt had suffered a number of health issues throughout his life, including a number of heart attacks. On 14 June 2016, Parfitt suffered a fourth heart attack after performing with Status Quo in Antalya, Turkey. Following this, Parfitt retired from touring with the band for health reasons, and started to work on a number of projects, including his solo album. Prior to his death in December, Parfitt had completed vocal and guitar tracks for the album, and the rest was completed by producers and collaborators.

Track listing

Release and reception

Over and Out was released in the UK and Europe on 23 March 2018. It entered the UK album chart at number four on 5 April 2018 remaining in the top 75 for two weeks, making it the highest new entry that week, as well as one of the biggest selling debut albums for the year thus far.
Upon release, it received generally positive reviews and reactions from both press and fans alike.

Personnel
Rick Parfitt – vocals and guitar on all tracks; ukelele on Track 4; writing on all tracks except 7 and 8
 Jo Webb – guitar and backing vocals on all tracks except Track 10; keyboards on Tracks 1, 2, 3, 4 and 6; writing on all tracks except 6, 7, 8 and 10
 Alex Toff – drums on all tracks except Track 10
 Tim Oliver – synthesizer on Tracks 1, 2 and 7
 Dave Marks – percussion on all tracks except Track 10, bass on Tracks 1, 3, 4, 5, 6 and 9
 Shannon Harris – piano on tracks 1, 5, 6, 8 and 9
 Rick Parfitt Jr. – backing vocals on Tracks 1, 5 and 8; percussion on Track 9
 Brian May – guitar on Track 1
 Eike Freese – backing vocals on Track 5
 Ivan Hussey – cello on Track 6
 Stephen Hussey – violin and viola on Track 6
 Chris Wolstenholme – bass, guitar and backing vocals on Track 7
 Alan Lancaster – backing vocals on Track 8
 John "Rhino" Edwards – bass on Tracks 2, 8 and 10
 Wayne Morris – guitar on Track 8
 Bob Young – harmonica on Track 8
 Jeff Rich – drums on Track 10
 Katie Kissoon – backing vocals on Track 10
 Stevie Vann – backing vocals on Track 10
 Vicki Brown (credited as "Vikki Brown") – backing vocals on Track 10
 John David – writing on Tracks 7 and 8

Production
 Producer: Jo Webb
 Co-producer: Rick Parfitt Jnr
 Executive Producer: Paul Christian Ashcroft
 Engineering: Dave Marks, Eike Freese, Kris Fredriksson and Matt Prior
 Mastering: Frank Arkwright, Rob Cass
 Mixing: Ash Howes
 Cover art: Bernhard Prinz
 Artwork: Alexander Mertsch
 Photography: Heiko Roith

Charts

References 

2018 albums
Albums published posthumously